Apraksin Yard (also Apraxin Dvor) is a  market and retail block in Saint Petersburg, Russia, currently under a massive long-term renovation project. The buildings of Apraksin Dvor nestle between Sadovaya Street and the Fontanka River, just southwest of the Alexandrinsky Theatre.

The first market on the spot originated in the mid-18th century, deriving its name from Count Apraksin who owned the plot. After a merchant named Shchukin purchased a portion of it, that part became known as Shchukin Dvor. The market buildings were wooden and burnt to the ground in 1782.

In 1863, a new department store was opened on the spot. It was built to a design by Geronimo Corsini. Over the next decade, more than 45 shops were constructed in the vicinity. In 1913, Apraksin Dvor contained more than 500 shops. A further 270 small wholesale enterprises were located on the grounds of Shchukin Dvor.

After the Russian Revolution of 1917, most buildings of Apraksin Dvor were given over to use as depots and warehouses.

By the beginning of the 21st century, Apraksin Dvor was a large city of block of small, downmarket shops facing the street with an open-air market - mostly clothing and accessories - on the inside: an enormous downmarket retail area in the middle of the ever more upscale city center. A long-term renovation plan was instituted; the market stalls were removed in 2008-9 to the Grazhdansky Rynok market (see article on Russian Wikipedia) on the periphery of the city. There are plans to turn the area into a modern, pleasant retail, office, residential, hotel and cultural space. Wilkinson Eyre Architects and Foster and Partners are the lead architectural firms.

Further reading 
Рубахин В. Ф. Графы Апраксины и их петербургская вотчина - Апраксин двор. СПб., 1912.

References

Buildings and structures in Saint Petersburg
Department stores of Russia
1863 establishments in the Russian Empire
Shopping malls in Russia
Cultural heritage monuments of regional significance in Saint Petersburg